Outlaw Pete is a 2014 book by Bruce Springsteen, with artwork by Frank Caruso, based on the song of the same name from Springsteen's album, Working on a Dream.

Outlaw Pete is about a bank-robbing baby whose exploits become a meditation on sin, fate, and free will. According to Springsteen, "Outlaw Pete is essentially the story of a man trying to outlive and outlast his sins." The story came from many sources, including the many colorful characters on his album The Wild, the Innocent & the E Street Shuffle, every western he had seen since he was a kid, and bedtime stories of Brave Cowboy Bill his mother used to recite to him as a child.

References 

2014 graphic novels
American graphic novels
Bruce Springsteen